The CA engine is a series of  Inline-4 piston engines from Nissan. It is designed for a wide variety of smaller Nissan vehicles to replace the Z engine and some smaller, four-cylinder L series engines. The "CA" stands for Clean Air, due to the installation of Nissan emission reducing technology, called NAPS-X.

The CA is an iron block, aluminum head design with a timing belt, cheaper to make than the timing chain setup on the Z and L engines. Earlier versions featured SOHC and eight valves. The new CA block design was a scaled-up E series block with timing shaft and other ancillaries removed. The oil pump is fitted directly onto the crank nose and the distributor is driven by the end of the camshaft. Like the E series and the A block from which the E was derived, Nissan used a taller block for the largest stroked 2.0-litre engine.

Later versions featured DOHC with 16 valves for increased efficiency at high engine speeds and a smoother power delivery. The hydraulic lifters are interchangeable between all DOHC RB and VG series engines excepting those with solid lifters. The Nissan CA would also be developed into a diesel engine, known as the CD, which replaced the four-cylinder LD series.

Production of the CA series ceased in 1994. The engine was deemed too expensive to produce due to its block being cast-iron. Additionally, it no longer met the ever-changing Japanese emission standards emerging at the time. The 1.8 L and 2.0 L versions were replaced by the SR series as Nissan's primary four-cylinder engine, while the smaller 1.6 L version was replaced by the GA series. Engines for the low volume European markets, such as the 200SX, were supplied by the overstock between Japanese and Australian markets.

CA16
The CA16 series of engines is a  engine produced from 1985 through 1990.

CA16S 

The CA16S is a  water cooling serial 4-cylinder OHC engine.

Applications:
 1989 Nissan Bluebird U11 - , 
 1985-1990 Nissan Bluebird T12/T72
 1986-1990 Nissan Auster T12 "1.6Vc", "1.6Mc"
 1986-1990 JDM Nissan Stanza T12 "Supreme 1.6"
 Yue Loong Feeling 101, 102. , double-barrel carburetor

CA16DE

The CA16DE is a  engine produced from 1987 through 1989. It was a 16-valve DOHC engine with multi-port fuel injection, for front wheel drive use. North American versions used Nissan's NICS (Nissan Induction Control System), which opened up the secondary intake ports to each cylinder via a butterfly valve in each port. Activated at 3,900 rpm, this improved flow and performance resultingly. Additionally, on activation of the secondaries under a heavy load the fuel injection also went from sequential mode to simultaneous-pulse mode. These features were also found on North American CA18DE engines.

Applications:
 Nissan Pulsar NX SE (United States and Canada)
 Nissan EXA (Australia and Japan)
 Nissan Sunny B12
 Nissan Sunny N13 (Europe)
 Nissan Pulsar N13 Twincam

CA18

CA18S 

The  CA18(s) was a carbureted version of the CA engine available in Japan.
It was used in the following vehicles:
 1984 Nissan Laurel (C32)
 1984 Nissan Skyline (R30)
 1985-1987 Nissan Skyline (R31)
 1988 Nissan Stanza (T12)
 1987-1988 Nissan Auster (T12)
 1985-1990 Nissan Bluebird (U11)
 1988-199? Nissan Bluebird (U12; export only)

CA18(i)

The CA18(i) is a naturally aspirated engine it delivers  at 5200 rpm. The fuel in this engine is not delivered via Multi Port Fuel Injection (E letter code on MPFI engines), it's instead delivered by Throttle Body Fuel Injection hence the (i) letter on the engine code.

Applications:
 Nissan Skyline R31, R32 GXi
 Nissan Laurel C33
 Nissan Auster T12 series, "1.8Vi", 1.8Mi", 1.8Xi"
 Nissan Bluebird RNU12
CA18 for Arex was delivered with Lucas multi port Fuel Injection.

CA18E

The CA18E is a naturally aspirated, single-cam engine. It uses Multi Point Fuel Injection.

Applications
 Nissan Bluebird 1.8 SSS-E (U11) -  at 5600 rpm,  at 2800 rpm
 1983.08-1985.08 Nissan Skyline 1.8 TI (R30)

CA18DE

The CA18DE is a  DOHC engine produced from 1985 through January 1991. It uses the same aluminium 16-valve head as the CA18DET, but it did not use the piston oil squirters that are found on the CA18DET. A crank girdle as found on all CA18DETs is fitted into some versions of the engine in some markets; Nissan's parts data system "FAST" has to be consulted or the sump removed to determine if it can be fitted.

Applications:
 Nissan Pulsar NX SE (United States and Canada)
 Nissan EXA (Australia & Japan)
 1985-1991  Nissan Skyline HR31 1800I (Japan)
 1989-1990 Nissan Silvia/180SX P/S13
 Mid 1980s Nissan Sunny N13 (UK)  (no girdle)
 Mid 1980s Nissan Sunny B12 Coupe (UK)  (has girdle)
 Late 1980s Nissan Bluebird T72 (UK) 
 Nissan Bluebird (Sept'87 - Oct'89) RNU12 (FWD & AWD)
 1985-1990 Nissan Auster "1.8Xt TwinCam" (has girdle)
 1988-1991 KN13 Nissan EXA (Australian market)

CA18ET

The  CA18ET was produced from 1984 through 1992. The low-pressure turbo has a  overcharge. The engine has fuel and air delivered via ECCS Multiport Fuel Injection, a system developed together with Hitachi.

It was used in the following vehicles:
 1984-1986 Nissan 200SX Turbo (US) (until 1988 in Canada)
 1984-1986 Nissan Bluebird U11 Turbo (Europe)
 1983-1985 Nissan Bluebird U11 SSS-X (Japanese Market) -  at 6000 rpm,  at 3600 rpm
 1986-1988 Nissan Silvia (Japanese Market)
 1986-1990 Nissan Bluebird T12/T72 Turbo (Europe)
 1985-1990 Nissan Auster 1.8Xt
 Mid 1980s Nissan Silvia S12 (Europe)
 1986-1990 Reliant Scimitar SS1 1800Ti
 1990-1992 Reliant Scimitar SST 1800Ti
 1992-1995 Reliant Scimitar Sabre 1800Ti

CA18DET

The  CA18DET was the last version of the CA engine to be released, manufactured from 1985 to 1994. It has a brand new DOHC aluminum head with 16 valves. The turbocharger was also upgraded to a Garrett T25 (.48 A/R) unit for increased flow capacity, and as such, was fitted with an intercooler to help prevent the onset of pre-ignition and/or detonation. Fuel was delivered via Multiport Fuel Injection.

There were 2 versions of the CA18DET available, yet only one was produced for Japan. The late model Japanese CA18DETs received 8 port (low port) heads, with butterfly actuated auxiliary ports in the lower intake manifold which corresponded with 8 ports in the head.

Below c. 3,800 rpm, only one set (4 ports open, 1 per cylinder) of long, narrow ports would be open, accelerating the intake charge to the cylinder. This allowed for quick spool and good low-end tractability. At the 3800 rpm change over, not only would the ECCS shift into batch fire (as opposed to sequential) fuel injection, but it also opened the second set of short, wide ports (8 ports open, 2 per cylinder) which assisted in high RPM flow.

This engine is known for stronger torque characteristics, as well as faster spool at lower RPMs. However, due to displacement-based taxation and cost of emissions testing in Europe, the CA18DET was sold as the only available engine in the S13 chassis 200SX (Euro model) until replaced by the S14 in 1994. The Euro motors received the 4 port (high port) head and intake manifold, as well as revised ECCS ("Electronic Concentrated Control System") parameters.

It was used in the following vehicles:
 1987-1988 Silvia S12 RS-X
 1987-1989 Silvia S12 Grand Prix final edition in Europe
 1988-mid 1990 Nissan Silvia/180SX S13 (Japanese market)
 1987-1989 Nissan Bluebird RNU12 SSS ATTESA Limited (Japanese Market)
 1989-1994 Nissan 200SX RS13-U Europe.
 1985-1990 Nissan Auster "1.8Xtt" and "Euroform Twincam Turbo"

CA20
The CA20 is a series of SOHC  engine produced from 1982 through 1991 (possibly longer for the CA20P).

CA20P

The CA20P is a carbureted, single overhead cam designed to run on LPG. It came in two claimed different power outputs, initially  JIS gross at 5,600 rpm and later  JIS net at 4,800 rpm. This engine was usually installed in professional cars and was not regularly available to private buyers. It was replaced by the NA20P engine in mid-1991.

Applications:
 Nissan Cedric NJY30 (1983.06-1987.06)
 Nissan Cedric NJY31 (1987.06-1991.06)
 Nissan Gloria NJY30 (1983.06-1987.06)
 Nissan Gloria NJY31 (1987.06-1991.06)

CA20S

The CA20S is an SOHC  engine produced from 1982 through 1987, fed by a carburetor.

Applications:
 Nissan Stanza
 Nissan Prairie M11/M12 Europe
 Nissan Auster
 Nissan Bluebird Series 3 1985-1986 (Australia)
 Nissan Bluebird U11 Estate 1985-1990 (Europe)
 Nissan Bluebird T12 1985-1988 (Europe)
 Nissan Laurel (C32) 1984-1990 (no twin spark)
 Nissan Skyline GL and GLE (R31)
 1983–1987 Nissan Cedric/Gloria Y30 ( at 5,600 rpm)
 Nissan Vanette C22 / Vanette Largo GC22 Model, Japan

CA20E

The SOHC  CA20E was produced from August 1981 to 1991. Fuel was delivered via Multiport Fuel Injection. Dual spark plugs per cylinder were used in some variants of this engine for enhanced combustion efficiency, called NAPS-X.

It was used in the following vehicles:
 1984-1988 Nissan 200SX (US & Canada) / Nissan Gazelle (Australia)
 1986-1992 Nissan Pintara R31/U12 (Australia)
 1984-1990 Nissan Stanza
 1982-1988 Stanza Wagon (US)/ Multi (Canada) M10
 1987-1989 Nissan Bluebird / Bluebird ATTESA U12 (and was replaced by the SR20DE in the Series 2 U12 Bluebirds)
 1988-1990 Nissan Bluebird T72
 1986-1991 Nissan Pintara

CA20DE/CA20DET/CA20ET

There was never a factory-produced twin-cam 2.0 L CA engine, nor there was a turbo version. However, the blocks are similar, and it is possible to fit the DOHC CA18DE/CA18DET twin-cam head into the SOHC CA20 block. However, the DOHC/SOHC manifolds are different and the timing pulley/belts are not compatible. Despite this, however, several examples of a CA20DET engine have been built.

Stroker kits
Tomei and JUN of Japan produced 2–litre stroker kits for the CA18. Also companies like Norris Designs and Spool Imports produces CA20 stroker kits as well as a CA20 engine.

See also 
 List of Nissan engines

References

External links

 JDM Spec Engines - Nissan CA18DET Engine
 New Zealand Datsun Club

CA
Straight-four engines
Gasoline engines by model